TMZ is a tabloid news organization owned by Fox Corporation. It made its debut on November 8, 2005, originally as a collaboration between AOL and Telepictures, a division of Warner Bros., until Time Warner divested AOL in 2009. On September 13, 2021, Fox Corporation acquired TMZ from WarnerMedia for $50 million.

The name TMZ is derived from the acronym for thirty-mile zone that was historically used in the film and television industry to refer to the so-called "studio zone"—an area with a  radius centered on the intersection of Beverly Boulevard and La Cienega Boulevard in Los Angeles, California. It was called the studio zone because of the number of film and television studios within it.

TMZ's managing editor is Harvey Levin, a lawyer-turned-journalist who was previously a legal expert for the Los Angeles television station KCBS-TV. While the TMZ website claims that it does not pay writers for stories or interviews,  Levin has acknowledged that TMZ does "sometimes pay sources for leads on stories".

Development
Three months prior to the official launch of TMZ, America Online (AOL) had hinted that it was planning to launch a Hollywood and entertainment-centric news site that would be produced in conjunction with Telepictures Productions and had shown interest in launching a website featuring a focus mainly on celebrities. At the time of the launch, AOL confirmed that the site would primarily feature and consist of Hollywood gossip, including interviews, photos and video footage of celebrities and information pertaining to industry news on movies, television shows, etc.

The site was described as "an effort to further feed the current American obsession with celebrities". Mike Shields of MediaWeek.com wrote, "the site also boasts of an expansive collection of archived star photos and videos", allowing fans to "trace changing hairlines and waistlines of their favorites performers over the years".

Company synopsis

Since 2005, TMZ has signed New Line Cinema, Hilton Hotels, Chrysler and Revlon as charter advertisers to their website. The New York Times cited TMZ as "one of the most successful online ventures of the last few years." In October 2008, the New York Times reported that TMZ, at the time, was receiving more than 10 million viewers every month.

Levin has acknowledged that TMZ has passed on multiple notable coverages because he felt that, while the stories are true, he questioned how the sources obtained their information. Levin has acknowledged that TMZ pays sources, but in the form of a "tip fee". Levin stated that TMZ pays for photos and for 'tips' or leads on stories, and defended TMZ's position by stating that the sources and tips are verified before being used or reported.

In November 2009, TMZ's revenue was publicly disclosed for the first time. Telepictures (which TMZ is operated by) stated: "Subject to certain performance adjustments and the reimbursement of expenses, revenues are split evenly between the parties [...] Telepictures received payments of 6.2 million for the nine months ended September 30, 2009, and 12.7 million, 9.6 million and 3.0 million in 2008, 2007 and 2006, respectively." Based on released figures, TMZ's revenues for 2008 was 25.4 million and is projected to have less revenue in the 2009 year with the revenue of $12.4 million in first three quarters of the year—unlike the previous year, which was within the 15 million range.

On May 29, 2012, co-founder Jim Paratore died of a heart attack during a cycling trip in France. Paratore was known for his work in television production, producing several daytime and syndicated programs, particularly while serving as an executive at Telepictures (which co-produced the website's companion syndicated television series).

Legal issues

Contempt-of-court motion
On June 20, 2007, a court-appointed bankruptcy trustee filed an emergency motion requesting that the TMZ website be held in contempt for its publication of the entire manuscript of If I Did It, O. J. Simpson's purportedly fictionalized account of the murder of Ron Goldman and Nicole Brown Simpson.

The filing claimed TMZ's posting of the PDF of the entire book has "diminished or destroyed" its value.

Photographer altercation
While actor Woody Harrelson was at New York City's LaGuardia Airport, he had an altercation with a photographer for TMZ. Harrelson defended himself stating that he had at the time just finished filming his scenes from the horror film, that consists mainly of zombies, Zombieland, and that he was "startled" by the TMZ photographer. "I wrapped a movie called Zombieland, in which I was constantly under assault by zombies, then flew to New York, still very much in character ... With my daughter at the airport I was startled by a paparazzo, who I quite understandably mistook for a zombie."

Temporary block in the UK
On December 24, 2010, the gossip blog "Oh No They Didn't" reported that TMZ began blocking traffic from the UK, displaying the message: "Due to laws within your region, you are unable to view this website." Asked for further comment, TMZ responded that the blocking was due to "legal restrictions" related to English defamation law. The UK website "Popbitch Board" noted on December 31, 2010, that it is possible to get around the block by accessing the website through the Google Translate website. As of January 7, 2011, TMZ is accessible in the UK.

Branches

TMZ Live
TMZ Live is a live-chat program from TMZ that features Levin and fellow TMZ executive producer Charles Latibeaudiere, and occasionally senior producer Michael Babcock filling in for one or both hosts. Other TMZ staffers (mainly those who regularly appear on TMZ on TV) also appear on the broadcast as contributors to provide additional outline of the story as well as to provide opinion. The live webcast takes place at the TMZ offices in Los Angeles, and is broadcast on TMZ.com Monday through Fridays from approximately 1:30 to 3:00 p.m. Eastern Time (the length varies depending on the featured segments).

The TMZ Live television and Internet programs review stories that TMZ is covering on the website, and at times, features live interviews (most of which are conducted through webcam conferencing) as well as viewer opinions via Twitter, telephone and video chat (including Skype). In addition, the program features regular segments towards the end of each edition: "Viewer's Choice" (aired as the penultimate segment) featuring viewer questions or comments about stories featured in the broadcast, with additional commentary or analysis by the hosts. "Hate Mail," featured on the Wednesday edition of the webcast (the Thursday edition on the television broadcast), in which negative emails and letters sent by viewers (some of which feature potshots at Levin or Latibeaudiere) are read by the hosts

"Tim's Rejects," featured on the Thursday edition of the webcast (the Friday edition on the television broadcast), in which staffer Tim Nowak presents three offbeat news stories (that are not entertainment or sports-related) which are critiqued by the hosts. "The Loser's Circle," featured on the Friday edition of the webcast (the Monday edition on the television broadcast) since February 2015, in which Levin, Latibeaudiere and TMZ on TV executive producer Evan Rosenblum judge a clip from a TMZ videographer that was originally rejected from being posted on TMZ.com by Levin or broadcast on TMZ on TV by post-production supervisor Chad Weiser following its initial pitch. "Tim's Rejects" and "Hate Mail" were previously aired as the last segment of their respective editions until April 2015, when they were shifted to the block preceding that occupied by the "Viewer's Choice" segment (at which point, all three segments as well as "The Loser's Circle" began to be followed by a story segment).

In March 2012, Fox Television Stations tested a syndicated broadcast of TMZ Live (which is an hour-long edited version of the live webcast that is broadcast on a one-day delay from its original tape date, with segments aired in a different order, mainly due to live interviews that require the segment to be shown out of order on the webcast for varied reasons) on its television stations in Los Angeles and Phoenix. In June 2012, SiriusXM Radio announced that the show would be aired daily on its Sirius XM Stars channel. In October of that year, the television show was expanded to seven markets, adding Boston, Chicago, Dallas, Detroit and Minneapolis. On September 9, 2013, TMZ Live began airing on all 18 Fox owned-and-operated stations. The program began to be syndicated to stations outside of the Fox Television Stations group in the spring of 2014.

TMZ on TV

On September 10, 2007, TMZ launched an accompanying television series, TMZ on TV. The syndicated television program airs Monday through Fridays.

In the United States, the show airs in various timeslots on stations of varying network affiliation (primarily on Fox stations), mainly either in early primetime or after late local newscasts, with an hour-long 'best-of' program compiling select stories from the weekday broadcasts airing on weekends. The show covers stories similar to those found on the website and TMZ Live, with the main difference being that TMZ on TV largely delivers its stories in a humorous manner whereas a mix of humorous and serious news stories appear on the website and companion web/television series. TMZ offers viewers the option of being able to view the two most recent episodes of the program on TMZ.com after the episode's original airdate (being available for viewing for two days after the broadcast on weekdays and three days after the original broadcast on weekends).

Chris Persell, of TVWeek.com, stated that the show is a "complement [to] the website, with news updates added to later airings of the show". Levin and Jim Paratore served as executive producers to the show, and the on-air cast originally included Teresa Strasser, John Fugelsang, Ben Mankiewicz and Michael Hundgen. David Bianculli of The New York Daily News strongly criticized the television show, its topics, and what he sees as its reporters' tactics and lack of professionalism.

Dax Chat
Dax Chat is a live chat program on Ustream hosted by TMZ clip clearance producer Dax Holt. In the broadcasts, Holt talks to "Chizzlers" about celebrity gossip and articles that have been posted on the TMZ website.

TMZ Sports
As early as 2009, Levin was rumored to be interested in creating a TMZ branded sports site. The site was initially expected to launch in March 2010 but those plans did not see fruition. It eventually launched as a branded section on the main TMZ website in June 2013. Premiere Networks launched a daily TMZ Sports radio show in October 2013. A television show began testmarketing on select regional Fox stations in January 2014. It then aired during the 2014/2015 seasons on Reelz under name TMZ Hollywood Sports. On November 9, 2015, the series reverted to being known as TMZ Sports and moved to Fox Sports 1. TMZ Sports is co-hosted by TMZ Sports Executive Producer Michael Babcock, WNBA player Renee Montgomery, and former WWE Superstar and NFL player, Mojo Muhtadi.

TMZ France
TMZ France was created on December 18, 2012.

Criticism
Since the launch of TMZ, the website has faced criticism, varying from attempted boycotts to criticism of its journalistic tactics and of its focus. It has been criticized for its usage of photographs and videos obtained from paparazzi. Some have questioned the effect that aggressive and obtrusive photographers have on the subjects they cover. Many of the videos on the site show, in the footage, that their paparazzi chase people (mainly celebrities)—a practice that has been called dangerous and "creepy". Over the years, some have called for a boycott of TMZ and of the accompanying show.

TMZ has also faced internal criticism due to Harvey Levin's emerging support for Donald Trump in the run-up to the 2016 United States presidential election. By 2020, dozens of former TMZ employees had spoken to the media about a racist and misogynistic workplace culture which TMZ's internal leadership was unwilling to change.

Reporting of suicide details 
After Linkin Park lead vocalist Chester Bennington died by suicide in July 2017, TMZ reported in December 2017 that Bennington had attempted to drown himself nine months before his death; this information had been redacted from the Los Angeles County Coroner's report following a request from a lawyer representing Bennington's widow, Talinda. Talinda responded with criticism of the Los Angeles County Coroner's office for disclosing the information to TMZ as well as TMZ itself, concluding a Twitter tirade with the hashtag "#FuckyouTMZ".

In May 2018, TMZ reported intimate details of the suicide of Swedish DJ Avicii, who had died that April, with the headline "Avicii’s suicide caused by self-inflicted cuts from glass". Jennifer Michael Hecht, writing for Vox, criticized TMZ's reporting as being sensationalist and going against the CDC's recommended guidelines for reporting suicides, which include not mentioning the method of suicide. Talinda Bennington also reacted unfavorably, urging people to "[not] click on the TMZ article or any other about the private details of Avicii’s passing", adding "This is how [we] can stop [filthy TMZ]."

Stolen Indiana Jones items 
TMZ faced strong criticism for purchasing stolen items pertaining to the fourth Indiana Jones film, Indiana Jones and the Kingdom of the Crystal Skull. On October 2, 2007, IESB reported that a number of production photos and sensitive documents pertaining to the production budget had been stolen from Steven Spielberg's production office.

Movie City News, which strongly criticized TMZ for purchasing stolen items, remarked that the then-new website "wasn't getting off to a good start". According to IESB, TMZ had obtained some of the stolen property and was planning on running a story about the topic on their TV show, until the lawyers of the film's production company, Paramount Pictures, intervened. Shortly after IESB broke the story, TMZ broadcast details about the Indiana Jones production budget on their show on October 3, 2007.

Story-gathering tactics 
Tony Manfred of The Cornell Daily Sun criticized TMZ in a September 2007 article entitled "I Want My TMZ", describing TMZ as being "a fusion of celebrity news blog and embarrassing video archive" and stating that he felt that the website had become "the poster child for the celebrity pseudo-news industry" and that the website has "distinct advantages" over "gossip magazines" because it can "show all the borderline pornographic clips that Entertainment Tonight and Access Hollywood can't."

Jennifer Metz and David Muir of ABC News acknowledged that TMZ has long been criticized for their "aggressive tactics, antagonizing stars with video cameras" and noted that those "encounters, capturing at times violent celebrity confrontations with photographers, receive hundreds of hits online, and critics ask if entertainment reporters are crossing the line." Metz and Muir questioned whether TMZ's tactics "go too far".

Ken Sunshine, publicist for Ben Affleck and Leonardo DiCaprio, stated that his clients disliked the website because it has a tendency to be negative towards celebrities when reporting on them. "I hate that they have anything to do with trying to put celebrities into the worst light possible and that they play the 'gotcha' game". A student newspaper criticized TMZ for having a personality cult of figures such as Lindsay Lohan and Paris Hilton—celebrities who are known more as targets for paparazzi than for the work they do. In defense for TMZ's coverage, Levin said that certain celebrities are main subjects on the website because of their "relevancy" and because their relevancy helps draw viewership to the website. Liz Kelly of Washington Post attacked both Levin and TMZ in an article, stating: "I know this is like spitting in the wind, but I have to say it: Harvey Levin, please stop it."

Murder of Andre Lowe 
On January 16, 2013, Andre Lowe was killed outside of a nightclub in Hollywood. A nearby reporter from TMZ ended up filming the attack and it was posted to the website without permission of the family. On January 22, 2013, TMZ ended up taking down the video after over two dozen advertisers revoked ads for the website because of the campaign.

Death of Kobe Bryant 
At 11:24 a.m. Pacific Time on January 26, 2020, TMZ reported on the death of basketball player Kobe Bryant, being the first news outlet to do so. TMZ received enormously negative criticism, notably from Sheriff Alex Villanueva of the Los Angeles County Sheriff's Department, for reporting on the story before the next of kin had been notified.

Johnny Depp Vs. Amber Heard 

During the defamation trial against actress Amber Heard, TMZ was a point of discussion and raised much criticism. Lawyer Camille Vasquez confronted Ms. Heard, claiming Heard gave a video of Depp being agitated and slamming cupboards to TMZ a day before the temporary restraining order (TRO) was filed. Vasquez also pointed out that TMZ had been alerted of the alleged abuse and the upcoming divorce in 2016, where Ms. Heard in her deposition mentioned that TMZ had been alerted. On May 24, 2022 TMZ, through EHM Productions Inc, filed an Emergency Motion to prevent a former employee from testifying in the Depp-Heard case. The motion was denied.

False news

John F. Kennedy 
In what The Smoking Gun called "a colossal screw-up", in 2009 TMZ published an "exclusive" picture on their website of a man purported to be John F. Kennedy on a ship with several naked women that could have "changed history" had it come out during his presidential campaign. Despite having a Photoshop expert proclaiming the picture as "authentic", the picture was later discovered to have not been of Kennedy at all. The photo was discovered to have been part of a Playboy photoshoot from November 1967, which was later confirmed by Playboy representatives.

Lil Wayne 
On March 15, 2013, members of TMZ's staff claimed that they had learned rapper Lil Wayne was in an "unstable" condition after he was hospitalized following a seizure and that the then 30-year-old rapper had been placed in an induced coma and was breathing through tubes. Soon afterwards, Birdman stated on his Twitter account that Wayne was healthy enough to be released from the hospital. Approximately one hour after these messages were made, Wayne himself stated on his Twitter account that he was fine.

Jerry Lee Lewis 

On October 26, 2022, they incorrectly reported that rock n' roll pioneer and country music legend Jerry Lee Lewis had died, they issued a correction a few hours later.  A CBS affiliate in Sacramento also reported the false news. Lewis' death was announced two days later.

References

Further reading

External links

TMZ TV Official MySpace page

American entertainment news websites
English-language websites
Telepictures
Former AT&T subsidiaries
Former Time Warner subsidiaries
2021 mergers and acquisitions
Fox Corporation subsidiaries
Internet properties established in 2005
2005 establishments in California